The 2009–2010 East Carolina Pirates men's basketball team represented East Carolina University during the 2009–2010 NCAA Division I basketball season. The Pirates were coached by Mack McCarthy and played their home games at Williams Arena at Minges Coliseum. The Pirates finished the season 10–21 and 4–12 in Conference USA play and lost in the first round of the 2010 Conference USA men's basketball tournament to eventual tournament champion Houston.

Recruiting

Coaching staff

Roster
Listed are the student athletes who are members of the 2009-2010 team.

Schedule

|-
!colspan=9 style=|Regular season

|-
!colspan=9 style=|Conference USA tournament

References

East Carolina Pirates men's basketball seasons
East Carolina
East Carolina Pirates
East Carolina Pirates